Mobiliya, also called Mobiliya Technologies and formerly Agreeya Mobility, is the global enterprise mobility and mobile System integration (SI) company based in Dallas, Texas, USA. It was incorporated as a legal entity in January 2011 under the guidance of its current CEO Krish Kupathil. Mobiliya also has operations in Canada, India, China and South Korea.

Products 

AgreeYa Mobility provides collaboration, communication products and services for all mobile platforms. The company also provides system integration, engineering support for mobile and other connected devices, and provides enhancements on Webkit, NFC, multimedia and other platform libraries. AgreeYa Mobility's key product is named Onvelop.

Onvelop is an enterprise mobility suite that allows users to utilize cloud services provided by Microsoft SharePoint over mobile devices. The application also features services of Microsoft Lync, Remote Desktop and  Print. It is currently available on Android, iOS, and Windows Phone 8 platforms. Onvelop was released in March 2013, at the Mobile World Congress in Barcelona, Spain.

Edvelop is a collaboration and communication based learning platform for students and teachers which enables online assignments, tests, class library, live audio-video sessions, and other features. The learning platform is a joint product of AgreeYa Mobility and Microsoft and sells under the brand name Mobiliya Edvelop.

References

External links
Official website
Onvelop Official Website
Agreeya Mobility Products
Protocol licensing agreement with Microsoft
Involvement with Microsoft's cloud solution for education sector

Mobile technology companies